The Island Resort Championship is a tournament on the Epson Tour (formerly known as the Symetra Tour), the LPGA's developmental tour. It has been a part of the tour's schedule since 2011. It is held at Sweetgrass Golf Club in Harris, Michigan.

The 2020 tournament was cancelled due to the COVID-19 pandemic.

Winners

References

External links

Coverage on Epson Tour website

Symetra Tour events
Golf in Michigan
Recurring sporting events established in 2011
2011 establishments in Michigan